A partial lunar eclipse will take place on June 6, 2039.

Visibility

Related lunar eclipses

Lunar year series (354 days)

See also
List of lunar eclipses and List of 21st-century lunar eclipses

Notes

External links

2039-06
2039-06
2039 in science